Roderick Benton McGill (July 15, 1888 – July 1968) was a Democratic member of the Mississippi House of Representatives, representing Benton County, from 1916 to 1920.

Biography 
Roderick Benton McGill was born on July 15, 1888, in Falkner, Tippah County, Mississippi. His parents were Henry Augustus McGill and Jessie Martha (Elliott) McGill. He was elected to the Mississippi House of Representatives, representing Benton County as a Democrat, in 1915. He was succeeded by his predecessor, W. E. Houston. He died in July 1968, while residing in Ripley, Mississippi.

References 

1888 births
1968 deaths
Democratic Party members of the Mississippi House of Representatives
People from Tippah County, Mississippi
People from Ripley, Mississippi